Haydenville may refer to:
Haydenville, California, former name of Bear Valley, Mariposa County, California
Haydenville, Massachusetts
Haydenville Historic District
Haydenville, Minnesota
Haydenville, Ohio